The SAE Supermileage Competition is a yearly fuel efficiency competition held at the Eaton Corporation proving grounds located in Marshall, Michigan, United States. The Society of Automotive Engineers is the primary sponsor. Around 30 teams compete to build the vehicle that uses the least amount of gas to go a specified distance. Teams are required to use a one cylinder lawnmower engine provided by Briggs & Stratton, but significant modification is allowed. There are two divisions, Collegiate and High School.

In the Collegiate division, the winning team of Laval University in 2016 achieved a record setting 3,788 miles per US gallon. The winning mileage of the 2008 competition was achieved by the team from Laval University located in Quebec City, Canada, achieving .

Mater Dei also captured first place in the 2004, 2005, 2006 and 2007 competitions in the High school division. . Since 2009, however, High School division is no longer acknowledged in the event, Collegiate Division being the only category left.

References

External links
SAE Supermileage Homepage
SAE Supermileage Results

Automotive events